Przeklęte oko proroka is a Polish historical film. It was released in 1984.

Cast 
 Lubomir Cvetkov as Hanusz Bystry
 Franciszek Trzeciak as Kajdasz
 Djoko Rosić as Kara Mordach
 Zbigniew Borek as kozak Semen Bedryszko
 Andrzej Kozak as father Benignus
 Aleksandar Gochev as Dragan/Janissary, Dragan's brother
 Nikolay Chadzhiminentev as Mongol
 Bogdan Baer as sergeant
 Andrzej Balcerzak as Heliasz
 Adam Probosz as Urbanek, Heliasz's son
 Henryk Bista 
 Edward Linde-Lubaszenko as Marek Bystry, Hanusz's father
 Gustaw Lutkiewicz as kozak Opanas Bedryszko
 Wiesław Gołas as kozak Midopak, Semen's partner
 Adam Romanowski as young peasant
 Janusz Kłosiński as Kalicki
 Krzysztof Litwin as merchant Grygier
 Dobri Dobrev
 Stefan Cvetkov
 Tadeusz Kwinta

References

External links
 

1984 films
1980s historical adventure films
Polish historical adventure films
1980s Polish-language films
1980s Bulgarian-language films
Bulgarian historical films
Bulgarian multilingual films
Polish multilingual films
1984 multilingual films